Hinewaia is a genus of the jumping spiders  found in New Zealand. Its single described species is Hinewaia embolica.

References

  (2002): Hinewaia, a new genus of Salticidae (Arachnida: Araneae) from New Zealand. Annales zoologici 52(4): 597-600.
  (2007): The world spider catalog, version 8.0. American Museum of Natural History.

Salticidae
Spiders of New Zealand
Monotypic Salticidae genera